In Gothic architecture, a lierne is a tertiary  rib connecting one rib to another, as opposed to connecting to a springer, or to the central boss. The resulting construction is called a lierne vault or stellar vault (named after the star shape generated by connecting liernes). The term lierne comes from the  French lier (to bind).

In England, the lierne came into use during the 14th-century  Decorated period of architecture. Gloucester Cathedral offers a good example of lierne vaulting. In France, examples occur in Flamboyant architecture, such as in the  Church of Saint-Pierre in Caen.

The vault-plan diagram of Ely Choir shows the ribs as double lines. The main longitudinal ridge rib (middle vertical lines) and transverse ridge ribs (alternate horizontal lines) intersect each other at the central bosses (large circles). The longitudinal ridge rib runs down the centre of the  choir, and the transverse ridge ribs span from the apex of each window at the sides of the choir. Arched diagonal ribs span from piers between the windows, from springers to the central bosses, and arched transverse ribs (alternate horizontal lines) span from the springers to the main longitudinal ridge rib. Secondary arched diagonal ribs, called tiercerons, span from the springers to the transverse ridge ribs. Liernes (shaded black) span between the other ribs, forming intricate patterning.

Note: in French terminology relating to architecture, a lierne is a ridge rib, and hence has a different meaning.

See also

Vault
List of architectural vaults

References
 Bond, Francis (1906) Gothic Architecture in England, Batsford, London.

Arches and vaults